LA-9 is a constituency of Azad Kashmir Legislative Assembly which is currently represented by the Farooq Sikandar Khan of Pakistan Muslim League (N). It covers the area of Fatehpur Thakiala (Nakyal) in Kotli District of Azad Kashmir, Pakistan.

Election 2016

elections were held in this constituency on 21 July 2016.

Kotli District
Azad Kashmir Legislative Assembly constituencies